The Kiss of Death is a novel written by Marcus Sedgwick, and the sequel to My Swordhand is Singing. It is based in 18th Century Venice, and follows the story of a young boy called Marco, who is searching for his father who has gone missing. Soon enough, old adversaries emerge.

Plot summary 

Death comes in many forms, but in Venice death comes by water...

It's the perfect place to hoard secrets. Here the Shadow Queen has her lair, and here she'll gather her forces for a final battle.

Marko and Sorrel are unwitting players in her Last Act as they search for his father, and try to stop the madness claiming hers.

In the dark alleyways, on silvery waterways slivers the light lance of the lagoon mist.

References

2008 British novels
Historical novels
Novels set in Venice
Novels set in the 18th century
Orion Books books